Elymniopsis is a monotypic butterfly genus in the family Nymphalidae. It contains only one species, Elymniopsis bammakoo, the African palmfly.

Range and habitat
It is found in Senegal, Sierra Leone, Liberia, Ivory Coast, Ghana, Togo, Nigeria, Cameroon, Gabon, the Republic of the Congo, the Central African Republic, Angola, the DRC, Uganda and Tanzania. The habitat consists of forests.

Description
Adults resemble Acraea poggei in flight. The white form of bammakoo mimics the female of Papilio cynorta.

Food
Adults are attracted to fermented bananas and have also been recorded imbibing sap from wounds in trees. The larvae feed on Elaeis guineensis, Phoenix reclinata and Raphia hookeri.

Subspecies
Elymniopsis bammakoo bammakoo
Range: Senegal, Sierra Leone, Liberia, Ivory Coast, Ghana, Togo, Nigeria, Cameroon, Gabon, Congo, Central African Republic, Angola, DRC
Elymniopsis bammakoo rattrayi (Sharpe, 1902) 
Range: eastern DRC, western Uganda, north-western Tanzania

References

Elymniini
Monotypic butterfly genera
Taxa named by Hans Fruhstorfer